The DTA Magic is a French double-surface ultralight trike wing, designed and produced by DTA sarl of Montélimar and introduced in 2010. The trike wing was the first "topless" design to be offered by a French manufacturer.

Design and development
The Magic is a strut-braced "topless" hang glider-style wing designed as a touring wing for two-place trikes. The wing is comparatively small in area, which gives a higher cruise speed. Its low drag design means that trikes equipped with this wing require less installed power.

The wing is made from bolted-together aluminum tubing, with its 84% double surface wing covered in Dacron sailcloth. Its  span wing has a nose angle of 130°, an aspect ratio of 6.4:1  and uses an "A" frame weight-shift control bar. The wing tips feature small winglets. It is manufactured by DTA's subcontractor, La société Ellipse.

Applications
DTA Combo
DTA Evolution
DTA Feeling
DTA Voyageur

Specifications (Magic 12)

References

External links

Ultralight trike wings